Kurtziella venezuelana, common name the wreath mangelia, is a species of sea snail, a marine gastropod mollusk in the family Mangeliidae.

Description
The length of the shell varies between 5 mm and 10 mm.

Distribution
K. venezuelana can be found in the Gulf of Mexico, off Colombia and Venezuela.

References

 Weisbord, Norman Edward. Late Cenozoic gastropods from northern Venezuela. Vol. 42. Paleontological Research Institution, 1962.

External links
  Tucker, J.K. 2004 Catalog of recent and fossil turrids (Mollusca: Gastropoda). Zootaxa 682:1–1295.
 

venezuelana
Gastropods described in 1962